Kris Bosmans (born 15 April 1980 in Elsene) is a Belgian cyclist competing in paracycling class C3, road and track disciplines.

Career in sports 
Kris Bosmans started in cycling sports at the age of 15. He had his first successes in the youth league. In 1998 he suffered a stroke and needed two years to recover. Since then, his right leg, left foot and left hand are handicapped.

In 2008 Bosmans watched a documentary about the paracyclist Jan Boyen who won a bronze medal at the Summer Paralympics 2008. This inspired him to try to become a paracyclist. In 2011 he became the world champion of street racing at the UCI Paracyling Street Racing event. In 2012 he started at the Summer Paralympics in London; in the street race he ended ranked 5th. Since 2010 he has competed at the Belgian National Championships, becoming the Belgian National Champion several times.

References

External links 
 Kris Bosmans - Cœur Handisport

Belgian track cyclists
Belgian male cyclists
1980 births
Paralympic competitors for Belgium
UCI Para-cycling World Champions
Living people
People from Ixelles
Cyclists from Brussels